Titignano is a village in Umbria, central Italy, administratively a frazione of the comune of Orvieto, province of Terni.

Titignano is about 63 km from Terni and 30 km from Orvieto, and it's located north to the Corbara Lake in the Natural Reserve of the Tiber.

References

External links 
 

Frazioni of the Province of Terni
Orvieto